is a railway station in the city of Inazawa, Aichi Prefecture, Japan, operated by Meitetsu.

Lines
Kōnomiya Station is served by the Meitetsu Nagoya Main Line and is 80.9 kilometers from the terminus of the line at Toyohashi Station.

Station layout
The station has two island platforms located on passing loops. The platforms connected by both a footbridge and an underground passage.  The station has automated ticket machines, Manaca automated turnstiles and is staffed.

Platforms

Adjacent stations

Station history
Kōnomiya Station was opened on February 15, 1924 as a station on the Aichi Electric Railway. On April 1, 1935, the Aichi Electric Railway merged with the Nagoya Railway (the forerunner of present-day Meitetsu).  The station building was rebuilt in December 2010.

Passenger statistics
In fiscal 2017, the station was used by an average of 22,861 passengers daily.

Surrounding area
 Nagoya Bunri University Culture Forum
 Inazawa City Hospital
 Owari Okunitama Jinja

See also
 List of Railway Stations in Japan

References

External links

 Official web page 

Railway stations in Japan opened in 1924
Railway stations in Aichi Prefecture
Stations of Nagoya Railroad
Inazawa